"Blue Highway" is a song written by David Womack and Don Henry, and recorded by American country music artist John Conlee.  It was released in July 1985 as the third single and title track from the album Blue Highway.  The song reached #15 on the Billboard Hot Country Singles & Tracks chart.

Chart performance

References

1985 singles
1984 songs
John Conlee songs
MCA Records singles
Songs written by Don Henry (musician)